John II (1311 – 2 April 1335) was Marquis of Namur from 1330 to 1335. 

He was the eldest son of John I, Marquis of Namur, and Mary of Artois.

He succeeded his father on 26 January 1330. He joined an alliance against John III, Duke of Brabant, but by the intervention of King Philip VI of France, a conflict was averted.

He died unmarried, but had an illegitimate son Philip, who was killed in 1380, while defending Dendermonde.
He was succeeded by his brother Guy.

1311 births
1335 deaths
House of Dampierre
Counts of Namur
John 02